The Bayer designations q Carinae and Q Carinae are distinct.

for q Carinae, see V337 Carinae
for Q Carinae, see HD 61248

Carinae, q
Carina (constellation)